Parliamentary elections were held in Northern Cyprus on 12 December 1993. Although the ruling National Unity Party (UBP) received the most votes, a government was formed by the opposition Democratic Party and the Republican Turkish Party, making this the first time the National Unity Party had lost power.

Results

References

Northern Cyprus
1993 in Northern Cyprus
Elections in Northern Cyprus
December 1993 events in Europe